Umami Burger is an American restaurant chain that specializes in gourmet hamburgers. The name refers to umami (savory) flavor. The restaurant was founded by Adam Fleischman, and is part of the Umami Restaurant Group. Umami Burger has waiter service and most locations have a full bar.  Its first restaurant opened in Los Angeles in 2009.  There were over 25 locations in California, Florida, Illinois, Japan, Nevada, and New York as of 2017.

In 2016, Sam Nazarian's global hospitality company, SBE Entertainment Group, became majority shareholder of Umami Restaurant Group and announced its plans to accelerate the restaurant's growth worldwide. Alvin Cailan was named the head chef of Umami Burger in 2021.

History
Fleischman was an aspiring screenwriter in 1998 when he moved to Los Angeles. In 2005, while eating a double cheeseburger at In-N-Out Burger, Fleischman pondered over the reason behind the popularity of burger and pizza restaurants in America. The word umami came to mind, a term he had seen on food blogs and in books by British chef Heston Blumenthal. It was then that Fleischman envisioned the financial potential of expanding on the basic burger and its umami properties. At the time, he was managing a wine business, BottleRock Wine Bar in Culver City, which he co-owned and later sold. He then held a variety of consulting positions and started another wine bar.

In 2009, Fleischman went to Mitsuwa Marketplace in West Los Angeles and bought any ingredient he could find with umami properties. He experimented for a month in his kitchen mixing seaweeds, miso, fish sauce, soy, cheeses, and pungent dried fish with a blender. He then opened his first Umami Burger with $40,000 from his sale of BottleRock. Located in Los Angeles on South La Brea Avenue, it replaced a failed Korean-taco shop.

Fleischman later partnered with hospitality-group SBE, Nîmes Capital, and Fortress Investment Group to expand the chain. After multiple openings in Los Angeles, it expanded to the San Francisco Bay Area in 2011. The original La Brea location closed in 2013 after its four-year lease expired; the site could sit only 60 people and lacked a liquor license, and it no longer fit the company's plans. Later that year, the first East Coast branch opened in Miami Beach, Florida, and New York locations were also scheduled to be opened. By 2019, they had expanded into Japan, opening their fifth location in Tokyo and first in Osaka. Alvin Cailan was named the new head chef of Umami Burger in 2021.

The logo for the burger chain is an abstract graphic resembling a hamburger bun. As early as 2011, Umami Burger obtained additional trademark rights in the United States for the use of the word umami from a restaurant named Umami Café in New York.

Menu

The restaurant's burgers are made using  beef patties, mostly from American Wagyu beef, that are coarsely ground in-house. The meat is seasoned with Umami Sauce—which contains soy sauce—and Umami Dust that includes ground-up dried porcini mushrooms and dried fish heads. Fleischman said that no monosodium glutamate (MSG) is added, despite claims to the contrary. Their tomatoes are slow-baked overnight with a soy-based sauce to enhance their flavor. Parmesan, which is also umami-rich, is provided as a cheese crisp. The burgers are served on a soft, Portuguese-style bun that meet Fleischman's desire for a basic supermarket-style bun that also feels artisanal.

Umami Burger provides over a dozen different burgers, and substitutions are discouraged. Priced at over $10, their burgers are more expensive than those at fast food restaurants. Their signature Original Burger includes the Parmesan crisp, shiitake mushrooms, roasted tomato, caramelized onions, and a house ketchup. In 2010, Umami Burger was named Burger of the Year by Alan Richman of GQ. Fleischman says that the food between their restaurant locations is not designed to each taste the same. "We want our customers to have a unique experience. We wanted to be a restaurant group, not a chain," he said.

In 2014, Umami restaurants in California announced a partnership with Coolhaus, a Los Angeles-based ice cream sandwich maker, to provide rotating flavors of their ice cream sandwiches on the dessert menu. In May 2017, Umami Burger partnered with Impossible Foods to create the Umami Impossible Burger, an entirely plant-based patty served with caramelized onions, American cheese, miso-mustard, house spread, dill pickles, lettuce, and tomato.

See also

 List of hamburger restaurants

Notes

References

External links

2009 establishments in California
Hamburger restaurants in the United States
Restaurants established in 2009
Restaurants in Los Angeles
Restaurants in the San Francisco Bay Area